In Judaism, confession is a step in the process of atonement during which a Jew admits to committing a sin before God. In sins between a Jew and God, the confession must be done without others present (The Talmud calls confession in front of another a show of disrespect). On the other hand, confession pertaining to sins done to another person are permitted to be done publicly, and in fact Maimonides calls such confession "immensely praiseworthy".

The confession of a sin in itself does not bring immediate forgiveness, but rather it marks a point in time after which a person's demonstration of the recognition and avoidance of similar future transgressions show whether they have truly recovered from the sin and therefore whether they deserve forgiveness for it.

The Hebrew Bible 
Vidui is not found as a noun in the Hebrew Bible, but the concept of confession and the hithpael verb form of yadah (ידה) – from which vidui is derived – are found, such as "Then they shall confess (הִתְוַדּוּ) their sin which they have done" (Numbers 5:7), and seems to fall into the category of speech actions. 

On Yom Kippur the High Priest confessed his sins and those of Israel onto a goat. Moses is instructed by God in Leviticus 16:21 to speak to Aaron: 
 
 "And Aaron shall lay both his hands upon the head of the living goat, and confess upon it all the iniquities of the children of Israel, and all their transgressions, for all their sins; and he shall put them upon the head of the goat, and shall send it away by the hand of an appointed man into the wilderness."

He is to "confess upon it". In modernity this is part of the Torah Reading for Yom Kippur morning and referenced in the recitation of the Avodah Service during Musaf.

The structure of a confession 
Maimonides, in his book Mishneh Torah writes in Hebrew:

"How does one confess? [By] saying: 'Please God! I have intentionally sinned, I have sinned out of lust and emotion, and I have sinned unintentionally. I have done [such-and-such] and I regret it, and I am ashamed of my deeds, and I shall never return to such a deed.' That is the essence of confession, and all who are frequent in confessing and take great value in this matter, indeed is praiseworthy."

In prayer 
In addition to each person's own personal confessions, in many communities a form of confession has been added to the daily prayer. There are two accepted structures of confession, the abbreviated confession (וידוי הקטן) and the elongated confession (וידוי הגדול), with both including a list of sins that a person confesses to in the order of the alephbet; the abbreviated confession lists one sin per letter and the elongated lists two.

Ashamnu,  the short confession 

The abbreviated confession is said by Nusach Sefard and most Sephardic communities (except Spanish and Portuguese) as a portion of Tachanun (daily supplications) immediately following the Amidah, and by all communities on Yom Kippur and during the recitation of Selichot. It is recited standing and quietly except on Yom Kippur when it is customary to recite it aloud.  In many congregations, (mainly Ashkenazic ones) it is even customarily sung on this date.  This form first appeared in the prayerbook of the Amram Gaon (8th century). 

This formula begins "We have incurred guilt, we have betrayed, we have stolen, we have spoken falsely, etc." (""). It is commonly known by its first word, Ashamnu (also transliterated Oshamnu).

Ashamnu is an alphabetic acrostic, consisting of 24 lines (the last letter of the alphabet,  (tav), used three times).  Each sin is usually expressed as one word (a few are two words), a verb in the past tense, first person plural.  The last two sins (repetitions of the letter ) are "" (taw'inu, titawnu) are usually translated as: "We went astray, We led others astray".  Occasionally the last word is translated as "You (= G-D) allowed us to go astray"—the widely used ArtScroll siddur uses both possibilities,<ref>Munk, Elie, The World of Prayer (orig. 1953, Engl. transl. 1963, NY, Feldheim) vol. 2, page 242 (for "You let us ...") and page 245, "The two last words ... which were added at the end of the alphabetical arrangement, are interpreted as follows:  taw'inu is a kind of recapitulation of all that has gone before; we admit that, indeed, we have gone astray; (see Isaiah 53:6 [& 63:17]) titawnu thereafter indicates that the Lord freely permitted us to stray and did not force us to remain on the right path, for 'he who has evil intentions will have [the gates of evil] opened wide for him.' ([Talmud,] Yoma 38b)"; Complete ArtScroll Siddur" (Ashkenaz ed, 2nd ed. 1987) pages 119b, 777 (for "You let us ..."),    page 833 ("we led others ..."), similarly Scherman, Nosson, The Complete ArtScroll Machzor – Yom Kippur (Ashkenaz) (1986, Brooklyn, Mesorah Publ'ns) page 853 ("You have let us ...").</ref> the point being that the last word is an unusual form (not found in the Bible) that suggests a positive determination to go astray, the misuse of free will.  However, the translation of "You let us go astray" has been criticized as an error, and it has been suggested that the last word means "we have scoffed" or "we have mocked" or "we tricked" or "we misled others".

The congregant stands, with head bowed in regret or shame, and with each confessed sin, thumps his fist over his heart.  Some individuals, who are fluent in Hebrew, might quickly add (silently or in a whisper) additional sins, not in the traditional list, beginning with the same letters.

There are spiritual explanations for the alphabetic arrangement, but the most obviously practical explanation is to make it much easier to memorize -- and also provide an end point for the list of sins, as Ashamnu is recited frequently and is supposed to be recited in the face of death. Additionally, by including every letter, the individual will be facilitated in recalling and repenting every sin, so that, when the end of the alphabet is reached, the individual presumably has repented of a complete catalogue of his sins.

 Al Cheyt, the long confession 
The elongated confession which includes the Al Cheyt (or Al Hayt) (""), ("For the sin ..."), a double acrostic in the Ashkenaz liturgy (a single acrostic in Sefardic and Italian liturgy), is said only on Yom Kippur. Al Cheyt is the Ashkenazic Hebrew reading of Al Chet.

Each line begins "For the sin we committed before You through ..." (על חטא שחטאנוּ לפניך בּ־); the prefix בּ־ meaning "through" or "by means of", and the rest of that word is in alphabetic sequence; בּאנס (compulsion), בּבלי דעת (ignorance), בּגלױ (publicly), בדעת וּבמרמה (knowingly and deceitfully), etc. and ends with בּתמהון לבב ("through confusion of the heart").  This is then followed by a non-acrostic list whose lines begin "And for the sin for which we are"—here naming the temple offering or the punishment (including lashing and death) that might be imposed. And concluding with a brief categorization of sins (such as the violation of a positive commandment, or of a negative commandment, or whether the sin can or cannot be remedied, as well as those we do not remember committing).  Although the text varies among the different liturgical traditions, it follows this general pattern.

With reference to the Ashkenaz text, it has been said, "Classifying the sins specified herein, we are struck by the fact that out of the 44 statements that make up the Al Cheyt, twelve deal with sins rooted in speech (five in Ashamnu).  Only four statements relate to transgressions committed by man against God in the strict sense (only two in the Ashamnu text). Dominating both confessional texts are general expressions of sin (fifteen in Al Cheyt and seventeen in Ashamnu)."

 Musical treatment 
It is traditional that both Ashamnu and Al Cheyt'' are chanted in a somewhat upbeat melody,  in the Ashkenaz tradition similar to one associated with the triumphant Song at the Red Sea.  This may seem unusual, as one might have expected a confession of sins to be chanted as a dirge.  But an uplifting melody is common in all Jewish traditions.  One explanation is that by this confession, "the worshipper is stimulated to a mood of victory and a sense of hopeful living in the face of an unknown and unpredictable future."  Or that, by making this confession and repenting, "our sins are transformed into merits."

Deathbed confession 

The Talmud teaches that “if one falls sick and his life is in danger, he is told: “Make confession, for all who are sentenced to death make confession.”” Masechet Semachot adds that “When someone is approaching death, we tell him to confess before he dies, adding that on the one hand, many people confessed and did not die, whilst on the other, there are many who did not confess and died, and there are many who walk in the street and confess; because on the merit of confession you will live.” Similar language is employed in the Shulchan Aruch's codification where it is ruled that the following text should be recited to the terminally ill: “Many have confessed but have not died; and many who have not confessed died. And many who are walking outside in the marketplace confess. By the merit of your confession, you shall live. And all who confess have a place in the World-to-Come.”

The patient is then to recite the deathbed Viduy. There is an abbreviated form intended for those in a severely weakened state and an elongated form, “obviously if the sick person wishes to add more to his confession—even the Viduy of Yom Kippur—he is permitted to do so”. Afterwards it is also encouraged for the patient to recite the Shema, enunciate acceptance of the Thirteen Principles of Faith and to donate some money to charity.

References

External links 
Confession of sins – a liturgical commentary oztorah.com September 2009
List of Viduy

Jewish law and rituals
High Holy Days
Confession (religion)